

Canadian Football News in 1919
Regular season play resumed following World War I.

W. A. Hewitt served as president of the Canada Rugby Union for the 1919 season.

No playoff games were held in Eastern Canada because of a rules dispute with the CRU in Western Canada, lack of interest in the East, and student studies to the Intercollegiate Union which were deemed more important.

Regular season

Final regular season standings
Note: GP = Games played, W = Wins, L = Losses, T = Ties, PF = Points for, PA = Points against, Pts = Points
*Bold text indicates that they have qualified for the playoffs, but did not play.
*Final league game was not played

* Two games from the final week were cancelled

* Six games were cancelled due to weather; Calgary Tigers and Edmonton Canucks withdrew from league and playoffs

League Champions

Western Playoffs
Note: All dates in 1919

SRFU–MRFU Inter-League Playoff

Regina Rugby Club advances to the WCRFU Final

WCRFU Final

Regina Rugby Club wins the WCRFU championship

References

 
Canadian Football League seasons